= America's Top Colleges =

College and university ranking system

America's Top Colleges is an annual Forbes ranking of colleges and universities in the United States, first published in 2008.

== History ==
Forbes rated Princeton University the country's best college in its inaugural (2008) list. The United States Military Academy at West Point took the top honor the following year. Williams College was ranked first both in 2010 and 2011, and Princeton returned to the top spot in 2012.

In 2013 and 2016, Stanford University occupied the No. 1 spot, with elite liberal arts schools Williams College and Pomona College topping the rankings in the intervening years. The magazine ranked Harvard University as America's best college from 2017 until 2021, when the University of California, Berkeley, topped the list, becoming the first public school to ever do so. They would be replaced by Massachusetts Institute of Technology (MIT) in 2022 and Princeton University would return again to the top spot in 2023.

== Current rankings ==
For the year 2027, the top fifteen colleges, according to "America's Top Colleges", are:

1. Massachusetts Institute of Technology (Cambridge, Massachusetts)
2. Princeton University (Princeton, New Jersey)
3. Harvard University (Cambridge, Massachusetts)
4. Columbia University (New York City, New York)
5. University of Pennsylvania (Philadelphia, Pennsylvania)
6. Stanford University (Stanford, California)
7. California Institute of Technology (Pasadena, California)
8. Yale University (New Haven, Connecticut)
9. University of California, Berkeley (Berkeley, California)
10. Vanderbilt University (Nashville, Tennessee)
11. Johns Hopkins University (Baltimore, Maryland)
12. University of California, Los Angeles (Los Angeles, California)
13. Duke University (Durham, North Carolina)
14. Cornell University (Ithaca, New York)
15. Northwestern University (Evanston, Illinois)

== Methodology ==
- "Alumni Salary": 20%
- "Debt": 15%
- "Return On investment": 15%
- "Graduation Rate": 15%
- "Forbes American Leaders List": 15%
- "Retention Rate": 10%
- "Academic Success": 10%

== Misreporting ==
Starting in 2013, four schools that had admitted to misreporting admissions data were removed from the list for two years. The four removed colleges were Bucknell University, Claremont McKenna College, Emory University, and Iona College.
